Edna Ryan may refer to:
Edna Ryan (activist) (1904–1997), Australian feminist activist
Edna Ryan (cricketer), New Zealand cricketer